Air pollution measurement is the process of collecting and measuring the components of air pollution, notably gases and particulates. The earliest devices used to measure pollution include rain gauges (in studies of acid rain), Ringelmann charts for measuring smoke, and simple soot and dust collectors known as deposit gauges. Modern air pollution measurement is largely automated and carried out using many different devices and techniques. These range from simple absorbent test tubes known as diffusion tubes through to highly sophisticated chemical and physical sensors that give almost real-time pollution measurements, which are used to generate air quality indexes.

Importance of measurement 

Air pollution is caused by many things. In urban environments, it can contain many components, notably solid and liquid particulates (such as soot from engines and fly ash escaping from incinerators), and numerous different gases (most commonly sulphur dioxide, nitrogen oxides, and carbon monoxide, all related to fuel combustion). These different forms of pollution have different effects on people's health, on the natural world (water, soil, crops, trees, and other vegetation), and on the built environment. Measuring air pollution is the first step in identifying its causes and then reducing or regulating them to keep the quality of the air inside legal limits (mandated by regulators such as the Environmental Protection Agency in the United States) or advisory guidelines suggested by bodies such as the World Health Organization (WHO). According to the WHO, over 6000 cities in 117 countries now routinely monitor the quality of their air.

Passive and active measurement 

Air pollution is (broadly) measured in two different ways, passively or actively.

Passive measurement 

Passive devices are relatively simple and low-cost. They work by soaking up or otherwise passively collecting a sample of the ambient air, which then has to be analyzed in a laboratory. One of the most common forms of passive measurement is the diffusion tube, which looks similar to a laboratory test tube and is fastened to something like a lamp post to absorb one or more specific pollutant gases of interest. After a period of time, the tube is taken down and sent to a laboratory for analysis. Deposit gauges, one of the oldest forms of pollution measurement, are another type of passive device. They are large funnels that collect soot or other particulates and drain them into sampling bottles, which, again have to be analyzed in a laboratory.

Active measurement 

Active measurement devices are more automated, complex, and sophisticated, though not always more sensitive or reliable. They use fans to suck in the air, filter it, and either analyze it automatically there and then or collect and store it for later analysis in a laboratory. Active sensors use either physical or chemical methods. Physical methods measure an air sample without changing it, for example, by seeing how much of a certain wavelength of light it absorbs. Chemical methods change the sample in some way, through a chemical reaction, and measure that. Most automated air-quality sensors are examples of active measurement.

Air quality sensors 

Air quality sensors range from small handheld devices to large-scale static monitoring stations in urban areas, and remote monitoring devices used on aeroplanes and space satellites.

Personal air quality sensors 

At one end of the scale, there are small, inexpensive portable (and sometimes wearable), Internet-connected air pollution sensors, such as the Air Quality Egg, PurpleAir, and Plume Flow. These constantly sample particulates and gases and produce moderately accurate, almost real-time measurements that can be analyzed by smartphone apps. They can be used for both indoor and outdoor environments and the majority focus on measuring five forms of air pollution: ozone, particulate matter, carbon monoxide, sulfur dioxide, and nitrogen dioxide.

Sensors like this were once expensive, but the 2010s saw a trend towards cheaper portable devices that can be worn by individuals to monitor their local air quality levels, which are now sometimes informally referred to as low-cost sensors (LCS). A recent review by the European Commission's Joint Research Center identified 112 examples, made by 77 different manufacturers.

Personal sensors can empower individuals and communities to better understand their exposure environments and risks from air pollution. For example, a research group led by William Griswold at UCSD handed out portable air pollution sensors to 16 commuters, and found "urban valleys" where buildings trapped pollution. The group also found that passengers in buses have higher exposures than those in cars.

Small-scale static pollution monitoring 

Unlike low-cost monitors, which are carried from place to place, static monitors continuously sample and measure the air quality in a particular, urban location. Public places such as busy railroad stations sometimes have active air quality monitors permanently fixed alongside platforms to measure levels of nitrogen dioxide and other pollutants. Some static monitors are designed to give immediate feedback on local air quality. In Poland, EkoSłupek air monitors measure a range of pollutant gases and particulates and have small lamps on top that change colour from red to green to signal how healthy the air is nearby.

Large-scale pollution monitoring 

At the opposite end of the spectrum from low-cost sensors are the large, very expensive, static street-side monitoring stations that constantly sample the various different pollutants commonly found in urban air for local authorities and that make up metropolitan monitoring systems such as the London Air Quality Network and a wider British network called the Automatic Urban and Rural Network (AURN).  In the United States, the EPA maintains a repository of air quality data through the Air Quality System (AQS), where it stores data from over 10,000 monitors. The European Environment Agency collects its air quality data from 3,500 monitoring stations across the continent.

The measurements made by sensors like these, which are much more accurate, are also near real-time and are used to generate air quality indexes (AQIs). Between the two extremes of large-scale static and small-scale wearable sensors are medium-sized, portable monitors (sometimes mounted in large wheelable cases) and even built into "smog-mobile" sampling trucks.

Remote monitoring 

Air quality can also be measured remotely, from the air, by lidar, drones, and satellites, through methods such as gas filter correlation. Among the earliest satellite pollution monitoring efforts were GOME (Global Ozone Monitoring Experiment), which measured global (tropospheric) ozone levels from the ESA European Remote Sensing Satellite (ERS-2) in 1995, and NASA's MAPS (Mapping Pollution with Satellites), which measured the distribution of carbon monoxide in Earth's lower atmosphere, also in the 1990s.

Methods of measurement for different pollutants 

Each different component of air pollution has to be measured by a different process, piece of equipment, or chemical reaction. Analytical chemistry techniques used for measuring pollution include gas chromatography; various forms of spectrometry, spectroscopy, and spectrophotometry; and flame photometry.

Particulates 

Until the late 20th century, the amount of soot produced by something like a smokestack was often measured visually, and relatively crudely, by holding up cards with lines ruled onto them to indicate different shades of grey. These were known as Ringelmann charts, after their inventor, Max Ringelmann, and measured smoke on a six-point scale. In modern pollution monitoring stations, coarse (PM10) and fine (PM2.5) particulates are measured using a device called a tapered element oscillating microbalance (TEOM), based on a glass tube that vibrates more or less as collected particles accumulate on it. Particulates can also be measured using other kinds of particulate matter sampler, including optical photodetectors, which measure the light reflected from samples of light (bigger particles reflect more light) and gravimetric analysis (collected on filters and weighed). Black carbon is usually measured optically with Aethalometer-type instruments.

Nitrogen dioxide 

Nitrogen dioxide can be measured passively with diffusion tubes, though it takes time to collect samples, analyze them, and produce results. It can also be measured actively, much more quickly, by a chemiluminescence analyzer, which measures nitrogen oxide levels from the light they give off. In the UK, for example, there are over 200 sites where  is continuously monitored by chemiluminescence.

Sulphur dioxide and hydrogen sulphide 

Sulphur dioxide is measured by fluorescence spectroscopy. This involves firing ultraviolet light at a sample of the air and measuring the fluorescence produced. Flame photometric analyzers are used for measuring other sulphur compounds in the air.

Carbon monoxide and carbon dioxide 

Carbon monoxide (CO) and carbon dioxide are measured by non-dispersive infrared (NDIR) light absorption based on the Beer-Lambert law. CO can also be measured using electrochemical gel sensors and metal-oxide semiconductor (MOS) detectors.

Ozone 
Ozone is measured by seeing how much light a sample of ambient air absorbs. Higher concentrations of ozone absorb more light according to the Beer-Lambert law.

Volatile organic compounds (VOCs) 

These are measured using gas chromatography and flame ionization (GC-FID).

Hydrocarbons 
Hydrocarbons can be measured by gas chromatography and flame ionization detectors.

Ammonia 

Ammonia can be measured by various methods including chemiluminescence.

Natural measurements 

Air pollution can also be assessed more qualitatively by observing the effect of polluted air on growing plants such as lichens and mosses (an example of biomonitoring). Some scientific projects have used specially grown plants such as strawberries.

Measurement units 

The amount of pollutant present in air is usually expressed as a concentration, measured in either parts-per notation (usually parts per billion, ppb, or parts per million, ppm, also known as the volume mixing ratio), or micrograms per cubic meter (μg/m³). It's relatively simple to convert one of these units into the other, taking account the different molecular weights of different gases and their temperatures and pressures. 

These units express the concentration of air pollution in terms of the mass or volume of the pollutant, and they are commonly used for measurements of both gaseous pollutants, such as nitrogen dioxide, and coarse (PM10) and fine (PM2.5) particulates. An alternative measurement for particulates, particle number, expresses the concentration in terms of the number of particles per volume of air instead, which can be a more meaningful way of assessing the health harms of highly toxic ultrafine particles (PM0.1, less than 0.1 μm in diameter).

Urban air quality index (AQI) values are computed by combining or comparing the concentrations of a "basket" of common air pollutants (typically ozone, carbon monoxide, sulphur dioxide, nitrogen oxides, and both fine and coarse particulates) to produce a single number on an easy-to-understand (and often colour-coded) scale.

History

Air pollution was first systematically measured, in Britain, in the 19th century. In 1852, Scottish chemist Robert Angus Smith discovered (and named) acid rain after collecting rain samples that turned out to contain significant quantities of sulphur from coal burning. According to a chronology of air pollution by David Fowler and colleagues, Smith was "the first scientist to attempt multisite, multipollutant investigations of the chemical climatology of the polluted atmosphere".

In the early 20th century, Irish physician and environmental engineer John Switzer Owens and the Committee for the Investigation of Atmospheric Pollution, of which he was secretary, greatly advanced the measurement and monitoring of air pollution using a network of deposit gauges. Owens also developed a number of new methods of measuring pollution.

In December 1952, the Great Smog of London led to the deaths of 12,000 people. This event, and similar ones such as the 1948 Donora smog tragedy in the United States, became one of the great turning points in environmental history because they brought about a radical rethink in pollution control. In the UK, the Great Smog of London lead directly to the Clean Air Act, which may have had consequences even more far reaching than it originally intended. Catastrophic events like this lead to pollution being measured and controlled much more rigorously.

See also
 Air quality index
 Environmental monitoring

References

Air pollution
Atmospheric chemistry
Measuring instruments
Public health